Željka Ogresta (born 28 June 1963) is a Croatian journalist and television presenter. She is married to Dubravko Merlić, with whom she has three children.

References

1963 births
Living people
Croatian television journalists
Croatian television presenters
Croatian women journalists
Croatian women television presenters
Television people from Zagreb